The Taking of the Gry is a novel by John Masefield published in 1934, and set in the fictional Central or South American state of Santa Barbara, also the setting for ODTAA, Sard Harker, and part of The Midnight Folk. The novel is set in 1911, some time after Don Manuel, the benevolent dictator in Sard Harker, has died. It is an adventure story about the taking of a ship called the "Gry". It features the only known map (or, rather, map illustration) of the City of Santa Barbara, and an appendix setting out the history of the fictional state of Santa Barbara.

External links
 

Fiction set in 1911
1934 British novels
English adventure novels
Novels by John Masefield
Heinemann (publisher) books